Geina tenuidactyla, the berry plume moth or Himmelman's plume moth, is a moth of the family Pterophoridae. The species was first described by Asa Fitch in 1854. It is found in North America, including Mississippi, Massachusetts, New York, Delaware, Maryland, West Virginia, Illinois, Ontario, Colorado , Nevada and California.

The wingspan is about 17 mm. Adults have been found feeding on dogbane flowers.

The larvae feed on the buds and leaves of Rubus parviflorus and wild and cultivated blackberries.

References

External links

Oxyptilini
Moths described in 1854
Taxa named by Asa Fitch